Makrochori is a town in the municipal unit of Apostolos Pavlos, Imathia, Greece. Since the 2010 local government reform, it is part of the municipality Veroia. It was the seat of the former municipality Apostolos Pavlos between 1997 and 2010. In 2011 its population was 5,189. It is situated 5 km northeast of the city centre of Veroia.

See also

List of settlements in Imathia

References

Populated places in Imathia